Emil Nofal (1926 – 18 July 1986) was a South African film director, producer and screenwriter.

Selected filmography
Director
 Song of Africa (1951)
 Kimberley Jim (1965)
 Wild Season (1967)
 My Way (1973)
 The Super-Jocks (1980)

Actor
 All the Way to Paris (1965)

References

External links

1926 births
1986 deaths
South African film directors
South African film producers
South African screenwriters
20th-century screenwriters